Jesus Crispin "Boying" Catibayan Remulla (born March 31, 1961) is a Filipino lawyer, politician, and broadcaster currently serving as Secretary of Justice since 2022. He previously served as the representative of Cavite's 7th district from 2019 to 2022, the position he previously held from 2010 to 2013, and currently the House Senior Deputy Majority Leader. He also served as the provincial governor of Cavite from 2016 to 2019, and was the representative of the province's 3rd district from 2004 to 2010. He is also a radio host for "Executive Session" on DZRH. Remulla is one of the vocal opponents against ABS-CBN and is among the 70 congressmen who voted to reject the franchise renewal of ABS-CBN.

Remulla took up political science as well as graduated from the University of the Philippines College of Law in 1987, where he was a fellow of the Upsilon Sigma Phi fraternity. He passed the bar exam in 1988. He is member of the Remulla political dynasty of Cavite: His father, Juanito, was the provincial governor for fourteen years. His brother Gilbert, a former television reporter for ABS-CBN, was the representative of the 2nd district from 2001 to 2007. His other brother, Jonvic, is the current provincial governor.

Political career
In 2001, he became the chief of staff of then Senator and former First Lady Luisa Pimentel-Estrada, wife of former President Joseph Estrada and spokesperson of Puwersa ng Masa before running for Congress in a controversial 2004 election. During the campaign, he was upset by Governor Erineo "Ayong" Maliksi, who was a fellow member of Partido Magdalo, because of his support to then mayor of Silang, Cavite Ruben Madlansacay, who ran as independent for congressman. He won as congressman in the district more than two years after the death of his predecessor, Napoleon Beratio.

In 2007, he won for the second term as congressman against then Deputy Presidential Spokesperson Manny De Castro, also from Silang.

In 2009, he among with fellow representatives of Cavite – Joseph Emilio Abaya and Elpidio Barzaga, Jr. – authored the biggest congressional reapportionment in the history of the Philippines by passing Republic Act No. 9727, unofficially titled The Cavite Congressional Reapportionment Act of 2009, bringing the representatives of Cavite from three to seven.

In 2010, he defeated Tagaytay Councilor Laureano Mendoza to claim his third consecutive term and first under the new 7th district of Cavite. On July 26, 2010, he became one of six Deputy Speakers of the House of Representatives under the speakership of Feliciano "Sonny" Belmonte, Jr.

In 2013 elections, he ran for Mayor of Tagaytay under the Nacionalista Party but lost to Agnes Tolentino of the Liberal Party. In 2016, instead of running for Congress against Abraham Tolentino, Remulla substituted his younger brother Jonvic to run as governor, which he successfully won. He served as governor of Cavite until 2019, when he successfully ran for congressman of the redistricted 7th district.

In 2020, Remulla played a major role in the ABS-CBN franchise renewal controversy along with Rodante Marcoleta and Mike Defensor. They accused ABS-CBN for tax avoidances (by using shell corporations such as Big Dipper), selling Philippine Depositary Receipts (PDRs) for foreigners (which is a possible violation of 1987 Constitution, prohibiting aliens for owning a mass media in the Philippines), using Channel 43 to continue digital broadcasts after the shutdown on May 5, using ABS-CBN facilities, and submitting an alleged tampered Torrens title. He enlisted the help of the National Bureau of Investigation to go after his critics on social media, accusing them of cyberbullying for criticizing him when he disrespected the Philippine national anthem. On July 10, 2020, Remulla, an ex-officio member of the Legislative Franchises, is one of the 70 representatives who voted "yes" to "kill" (deny) the twenty-five year franchise renewal of ABS-CBN, in favor of a report from Technical Working Group. After claiming continuous victory, Remulla joined with Defensor and Marcoleta for an online conversation via Zoom and streamed on Facebook as they discuss their plans to takeover the ABS-CBN Broadcasting Center in the future. This forum attracted controversy and their plans to take over the network's compound were slammed by Senate President Tito Sotto and pro-ABS-CBN advocate Christine Bersola-Babao. The former stated that the facilities of the network are constitutionally protected while the latter called the congressmen who initiated the forum as "evil".

Remulla was reelected to the Congress in 2022, unopposed. However, on May 23, 2022, Remulla accepted the offer to become the Secretary of Justice under the incoming administration of president-elect Bongbong Marcos, thus resigning his rights to the seat before his new term began in order to assume the position. He would be succeeded by his son, 7th district Board Member Crispin Diego Remulla, who was elected through a special election in 2023. He took oath as Justice Secretary on July 1, 2022, before Marcos.

On July 13, 2022, Remulla issued Department Circular No. 027, which creates the Prosecution Integrity Board to look into misconducts of government prosecutors and recommend sanctions against them if necessary, as his first order as Justice Secretary. He also issued a circular that would give himself additional powers over the National Prosecution Service (NPS), a unit under the Department of Justice. On July 28, 2022, he also said that he doesn't think that "we need to spend the next 100 years running after the Marcoses" while discussing the functions of the Presidential Commission on Good Government (PCGG) that went after the ill-gotten wealth of the Marcos family. He added that there is no need to abolish the PCGG.

In November 2022, Remulla rejected the recommendations for the Philippines to adopt SOGIE bill, laws legalizing same-sex marriage, divorce and abortion, and many more citing it "not acceptable in the Philippines, being a pre-dominantly Catholic nation." He added that "they want the SOGIE Bill for same-sex marriage to have the same as in their countries. So, that's not acceptable for us. They really want a lot to be implemented here." The justice department defended Remulla's decision to immediately reject all the recommendations.

Controversies

Alleged payment and red-tagging of Robredo supporters 
On a radio show on DZRH, Remulla questioned the large turnout of individuals during a political rally of presidential aspirant and Vice President Leni Robredo conducted in General Trias, Cavite. He alleged that the supporters of the candidate were paid P500 each to join the rally and that some individuals were simply ferried to the venue from other areas of the city to artificially create a large crowd. With uniformed volunteers and possibly local politicians simply leading or paying random passerby to join the rally. The grand rally in question is reported to have been the largest rally of the presidential candidate as of March 6, 2022, with at most 50,000 individuals joining the rally according to a local news report.

Remulla further stated that there were leftist student activists who joined the crowd. He alleged that these students were supposedly trained by the National Democratic Front, a leftist organization with ties to the Communist Party of the Philippines. He also alleged that Robredo had come to an agreement with the communists as well. Remulla was also joined by presidential candidate and provincemate Ping Lacson who, upon reading an article about Remulla's allegations, tweeted a warning about the dangers of a coalition government with the communists.

Robredo has since denied these claims and decried the red-tagging of Remulla's fellow "Caviteños" (term used to describe individuals from the province of Cavite), describing such red-tagging and accusations of vote-buying as an insult to Remulla's provincemates.

Remulla is a supporter of presidential candidate Bongbong Marcos. Together with the incumbent governor of Cavite Jonvic Remulla, Jesus Crispin has actively campaigned for Marcos.

References

|-

|-

|-

|-

|-

20th-century Filipino lawyers
People from Imus
University of the Philippines Diliman alumni
1961 births
Living people
Nacionalista Party politicians
National Unity Party (Philippines) politicians
United Nationalist Alliance politicians
Members of the House of Representatives of the Philippines from Cavite
Deputy Speakers of the House of Representatives of the Philippines
Governors of Cavite
Filipino radio personalities
Duterte administration personnel
Bongbong Marcos administration cabinet members